Richard Williamson (born 31 October 1944) is an Australian sailor. He competed in the Star event at the 1968 Summer Olympics.

References

External links
 

1944 births
Living people
Australian male sailors (sport)
Olympic sailors of Australia
Sailors at the 1968 Summer Olympics – Star
Place of birth missing (living people)